Tall Shur (also Romanized as Tall Shūr; also known as Tall Sūreh) is a village in Saroleh Rural District, Meydavud District, Bagh-e Malek County, Khuzestan Province, Iran. At the 2006 census, its population was 1,229, in 250 families.

References 

Populated places in Bagh-e Malek County